Fewston is a village and civil parish in the Harrogate 
district of North Yorkshire, England. It is situated north of Otley and close to Swinsty and Fewston reservoirs.

The Church of St Michael and St Lawrence is the village church. The majority of the building was constructed in 1697, although the tower dates from the 14th century. The Washburn Heritage Centre, adjacent to the church, opened in February 2011.

History 
Fewston was an ancient parish in the Forest of Knaresborough in the West Riding of Yorkshire.  It covered a wide area, and included the townships of Blubberhouses, Clifton with Norwood, Great Timble, and Thruscross.  All these places became separate civil parishes in 1866.  Fewston was transferred to the new county of North Yorkshire in 1974.

The poet Edward Fairfax lived at nearby New Hall, now submerged under the waters of Fewston Reservoir, as did Ferdinando Fairfax, 2nd Lord Fairfax of Cameron. Edward's daughters Elizabeth and Anne were baptised in the village church in 1606 and 1621 respectively, while Ferdinando's daughter Mary and son Charles were baptised there in 1606 and 1615.

References

External links

Fewston with Blubberhouses church website

Villages in North Yorkshire
Civil parishes in North Yorkshire